Loreto Kirribilli is an independent Roman Catholic comprehensive single-sex primary and secondary day school for girls, located in Kirribilli, a Lower North Shore suburb of Sydney, New South Wales, Australia.

Established at Milsons Point in 1901, Loreto has a selective enrolment policy and currently caters for approximately 1,142 girls from Kindergarten to Year 12.

The school is affiliated with the Association of Heads of Independent Schools of Australia (AHISA), the Junior School Heads Association of Australia (JSHAA), the Alliance of Girls' Schools Australasia (AGSA), and is a member of the Association of Heads of Independent Girls' Schools (AHIGS).

Loreto Kirribilli is one of many schools around the world established by the Institute of the Blessed Virgin Mary, or Sisters of Loreto, founded some 400 years ago by Mary Ward.

Its Sydney sister school is Loreto Normanhurst, and there are five other Loreto schools across Australia, in Melbourne, Ballarat, Victoria, Adelaide, Brisbane and Perth, as well as other international schools such as St Mary's Shaftesbury and Saint Mary's Ascot in the UK.

History
Loreto Kirribilli was founded in 1901 following the move of the day school of Loreto Randwick (founded 1892) to Kunimbla, a house in Milsons Point. In 1907, increasing enrolments necessitated a move to Fern Hill, a house in Upper Pitt Street, and in 1907 to the current site in Carabella Street.

Elamang, a home owned by early settler James Milson (1785-1872), was purchased in 1907 with the financial assistance of Sarah Heaton, mother of, Philomena Heaton (Institute of the Blessed Virgin Mary (IBVM)), a founding member of the Kirribilli community. This purchase allowed for boarders and an increase in day students. Adjacent properties were purchased over the years, including Coreena (previously owned by Alfred Milson) in 1921, The Hermitage in 1924, Thoms in 1952, and Araluen in 1975. The Loreto Kirribilli Chapel Tower was the highest point on the Kirribilli Peninsula for many years and remains a landmark dominating the skyline when viewed from Neutral Bay. Once the junior school, The Hermitage, was demolished in 1936 to make way for a playing field and tennis courts, and Coreena was replaced in 1961 by the present junior school. Government funding in the 1960s allowed for the building of St Joseph's wing, including science rooms and a library. This was also an era of significant growth in student numbers.

The boarding school began its phasing out period in 1968, following an explosion which destroyed St Mary's (Thoms). Loreto's last boarding students left in 1972. In 1980, Araluen, which had previously been a music centre, was extended to provide accommodation for the Loreto Sisters, and the community areas in the Elamang building were converted for use as staff rooms, general school administration and music.

In 2010, Loreto acquired the neighbouring Tremayne Private Hotel, formerly a Y.W.C.A. and renamed it the Marian Centre.

Principals

Curriculum

Compulsory subjects
In the Loreto senior school the following subjects are compulsory:
Religion- from year 7-12
English- from year 7-12
Maths- from year 7-12 or speak to principle in year 12
PDHPE- from year 7-10
Science- from year 7-10
Technology and Applied Studies- year 7-8
Music- year 7-8
Visual Arts- year 7-8 
Languages- year 7-8
Geography- Year 10
History- Year 10

Elective subjects

Year 8
In year 8 students choose a language from the following:
French
Italian
Chinese

Year 9
In year 9 students chose four electives, two subjects that run for two years (200 hrs) and two subjects that run for one year (100 hrs). They chose from the following subjects:
Academic Enrichment (100 or 200 hrs)
History Elective (100 hrs only)
Geography Elective (100 hrs only)
Visual Arts (100 or 200 hrs)
Photography and Digital Media (100 or 200 hrs)
Drama (100 or 200 hrs)
Food Technology (100 or 200 hrs)
Design Technology (100 or 200 hrs)
French (200 hrs only)
Italian (200 hrs only)
Mandarin (200 hrs only)
Music (200 hrs only)
Commerce (200 hrs only)
 PASS (200 hrs only)
Creative Communication (100 hrs only)
STEM (200 hrs only)
Thinking and Advocacy (100 hrs only)

Library
The newly renovated Loreto library was opened in July 2013. The library contains over 27 000 books and resources.  The library is located at the top of the Saint Joseph's (J) Block. At the 2013 Spring Fair the library raised $3 000 for their sister school in Panighatta by selling handmade book related jewellery, in a stall named 'Read-Cycled'.

Extra curricular activities

Debating
Loreto currently participates in three debating competitions:
ISDA - Each year has 1 team in year 6+
CSDA - Each year has 1 team in year 7+
Archdale - 2 teams from both year 7&8, One team in year 9+

Music
Students are encouraged to join musical ensembles such as the orchestra, choir, flute ensemble, concert band, stage band or chamber strings group. Private instrumental or vocal tuition as electives, is also available.

Sport

Loreto sporting teams participate in competitions run by a number of associations, including the Junior School Heads Association of Australia (JSHAA) for primary students, and the Catholic Girls' Secondary School Sports Association (CGSSSA), and Independent Girls' Schools Sporting Association (IGSSA) for those in the secondary school.

Sports offered to junior students include: Athletics, Basketball, Cricket, Cross country training, Equestrian, Gymnastics, Hockey, Netball, Rowing, Skiing, Soccer, Softball, Swimming, Tae Kwon Do, Tennis, Tildesley Shield Tennis,Volleyball and Touch football. In 2015 Loreto won the Interschools competition for Tae Kwon Do.

Houses
As with most Australian schools, Loreto has a house system to facilitate school based competitions and activities. House activities include Inter-house debating, Inter-house theatresports, athletics and swimming carnivals, music and drama festivals and other house activities. The school currently has four houses:
 Barry – Gold
 Heaton – Green
 Millson – Red
 Ward – Blue

There are a number of inter-house events during the year. These include the athletics carnival, swimming carnival, drama festival, dance night and Music Festival which is held annually at the Sydney Town Hall in June.

Notable alumnae
Tamsin Carroll – actress
Miranda Devine – conservative columnist
Emmy Dougall – actress in Home and Away and Danger Close: The Battle of Longtan
Isabel Durant – dancer and actress in Dance Academy and Mako: Island of Secrets
Amelia Farrugia – opera singer
Joan Hartigan – tennis player, Wimbledon finalist
The Hon. Julia Lonergan  - Supreme Court Judge
Clover Moore – Lord Mayor of Sydney
Phoebe Tonkin - model and actress in H2O: Just Add Water
Eliza Scanlen - actress in Sharp Objects and Little Women
Hollie Hughes (politician)
Kathryn Greiner- politician
Tara Rigney - Olympic rower
Francesca Hung-model/Miss Universe Australia 2018
Madolyn Smith - actress

See also 

 List of Catholic schools in New South Wales
 Catholic education in Australia
 Head of the River (New South Wales)

References

Further reading
 Emilsen, S. and Callaghan, M. 2006. A School With Spirit: Loreto Kirribilli. Alliance Distribution Service. .
 Meagher, F. 1997. Loreto Normanhurst: A Century of Memories 1897-1997. Allen & Unwin: St. Leonards, NSW. .

External links
 Loreto Kirribilli Website

Catholic secondary schools in Sydney
Catholic primary schools in Sydney
Girls' schools in New South Wales
Association of Heads of Independent Girls' Schools
Junior School Heads Association of Australia Member Schools
1901 establishments in Australia
Kirribilli
Convents in Australia
Kirribilli
Alliance of Girls' Schools Australasia